Nurmijärven Jalkapalloseura (abbreviated NJS) is a football club from Nurmijärvi, Finland. The club was formed in 2004 following the amalgamation of Nurmijärven Nateva and FC Nurmijärvi.  The club's home ground is at the sports area of Klaukkala (Klaukkalan urheilualue).  The men's first team currently plays in the Kakkonen (Third tier).

Background

NJS does not have a long history but the club gained promotion from the Nelonen to the Kolmonen at the end of the 2008 season.  NJS's predecessor Nateva played one season in the Kakkonen (Second Division), the third tier of the Finnish football system, in 2001. Nateva gained promotion from Section 1 of the Nelonen (Uusimaa District) at the end of the 2004 season which enabled NJS to begin life in the Kolmonen in 2005.  The new club's best season to date was in 2005 when they finished in 7th place in Section 2 (Helsinki & Uusimaa).

Season to season

Club Structure

Nurmijärven Jalkapalloseura runs a large number of teams including 2 men's teams, 2 men's veterans team, 2 ladies teams, 11 boys teams and 5 girls teams.

2010 season

NJS Men's Team are competing in Section 2 (Lohko 2) of the Kolmonen administered by the Helsinki SPL and Uusimaa SPL.  This is the fourth highest tier in the Finnish football system.  In 2009 NJS finished in tenth place in Section 2 of the Kolmonen.

NJS 2 are participating in Section 3 (Lohko 3) of the Vitonen administered by the Uusimaa SPL.

References and sources
Official Website
Finnish Wikipedia
Suomen Cup

Footnotes

Football clubs in Finland
Sport of Nurmijärvi
2004 establishments in Finland